The 2012–13 BYU Cougars women's basketball team represented Brigham Young University in the 2012–13 college basketball season. It was head coach Jeff Judkins twelfth season at BYU. The Cougars, members of the West Coast Conference, played their home games at the Marriott Center. They finished the season 23–11, 11–5 in conference play, to finish tied for 3rd in the conference. The Cougars advanced to the second round of the 2013 Women's National Invitation Tournament, where they lost to conference foe Saint Mary's. In an unusual event, the leader at Halftime of all 3 BYU/ Saint Mary's meetings would go on to lose the match.

Before the season

Departures

Redshirt News
The Cougars were bolstered by the news that Haley Steed would be granted a sixth year of eligibility after she missed out on two previous seasons from injuries. Steed missed out on her 2009-2010 season after playing only the season opening game against Portland State and then was given a medical redshirt during the 2010-11 season.

2012-13 media

BYU Radio Sports Network Affiliates

Many Lady Cougar games were broadcast live on BYU Radio found nationwide on Dish Network 980, on Sirius XM 143, and online at www.byuradio.org. Ty Brandenburg acted as the voice of the Lady Cougars for games not shown on BYUtv. 16 BYU games weren't available on BYU Radio, but of those 16 games 12 were broadcast on BYUtv. 2 of the remaining 3 games were streamed online live by the home team, and the Pepperdine game was available through Pepperdine's road broadcast. Only the Washington State game had no TV or audio broadcast available.

Roster

Schedule and results

|-
!colspan=12 style="background:#FFFFFF; color:#002654;"| Exhibition

|-
!colspan=12 style="background:#002654; color:#FFFFFF;"| Non-conference Regular Season

|-
!colspan=12 style="background:#002654; color:#FFFFFF;"| WCC Regular Season

|-
!colspan=12 style="background:#FFFFFF; color:#002654;"| 2013 West Coast Conference women's basketball tournament

|-
!colspan=12 style="background:#FFFFFF; color:#002654;"|2013 Women's National Invitation Tournament

Game Summaries

Chadron State
Series History: First Meeting
Broadcasters: Robbie Bullough, Kristen Kozlowski, and Kory Aldous

Dixie State
Series History: BYU leads regular season series 1-0
Broadcasters: Robbie Bullough, Kristen Kozlowski, and Shaun Gordon

Weber State
Series History: BYU leads series 39-9 
Broadcasters: Robbie Bullough, Kristen Kozlowski, and Blake Tillitson

at Dartmouth
Series History: First meeting Broadcasters: Brett Franklin (Big Green Insider)/ Ty Brandenburg (BYU Radio)

at Boston College
Series History: First Meeting Broadcasters: Ty Brandenburg (BYU Radio)

at Harvard
Series History: BYU leads series 1-0 
Broadcasters: Greg Kadetsky and Helen Williams (Harvard on Stretch)/ Ty Brandenburg (BYU Radio)

at Arizona
Series History: BYU leads series 6-5 
Broadcasters: Derrick Palmer and Lisa Salgado- Arizona on Pac-12 Digital/ Ty Brandenburg (BYU Radio)

at Washington State
Series History: BYU leads series 4-3

Creighton
Series History: Creighton leads series 6-5  Broadcasters: Robbie Bullough, Kristen Kozlowski, and Kory Aldous

Utah State
Series History: BYU leads series 30-3  Broadcasters: Robbie Bullough, Kristen Kozlowski, and Blake Tillitson

at Utah
Series History: Utah leads the series 61-39
Broadcaster: Ty Brandenburg (BYU Radio)

During the Utah State game BYU's leading scorer, Lexi Eaton, went down with an injury and was unable to return during the game. X-Rays were done a couple of days later, and Eaton was diagnosed with an ACL tear, ending Eaton's season. The good news for the Cougars is Jennifer Hamson returned to the BYU women's basketball team during the Utah game after the volleyball team's season ended with a Sweet Sixteen loss.

Tulsa
Series History: BYU leads series 6-0  Broadcasters: Robbie Bullough and Kristen Kozlowski

UC Santa Barbara
Series History: UCSB leads series 4-3  Broadcasters: Robbie Bullough and Kristen Kozlowski

Seattle
Series History: BYU leads series 1-0  
Broadcasters: Robbie Bullough and Kristen Kozlowski

Western New Mexico
Series History: BYU leads series 1-0  Broadcasters: Robbie Bullough, Kristen Kozlowski, and Shaun Gordon

San Francisco
Series History: BYU leads series 7-1  
Broadcasters: Robbie Bullough, Kristen Kozlowski, and Shaun Gordon

at San Diego
Series History: BYU leads series 4-0 Broadcaster: Paula Bott (USD on Stretch)

Pepperdine
Series History: BYU leads series 3-2
Broadcaster: Nick Law (Pepperdine on Stretch)

at Gonzaga
Series History: BYU leads series 5-4 
Broadcasters: Sam Adams and Stephanie Hawk Freeman (SWX)/ Ty Brandenburg (BYU Radio)

Loyola Marymount
Series History: BYU leads series 4-0 
Broadcasters: Robbie Bullough, Kristen Kozlowski, and Skyler Hardman

at San Francisco
Series History: BYU leads series 8-1 
Broadcasters: George Devine (USF on Stretch)/ Ty Brandenburg (BYU Radio)

Saint Mary's
Series History: Series even 1-1 
Broadcasters: Robbie Bullough, Kristen Kozlowski, and Skyler Hardman

at Santa Clara
Series History: BYU leads series 4-1 
Broadcasters: John Nash (Santa Clara on Stretch)/ Ty Brandenburg (BYU Radio)

San Diego
Series History: BYU leads series 5-0 
Broadcasters: Robbie Bullough, Kristen Kozlowski, and Skyler Hardman

at Saint Mary's
Series History: BYU leads series 2-1 
Broadcasters: Elias Feldman (Gaels Insider)/ Ty Brandenburg (BYU Radio)

Santa Clara
Series History: BYU leads series 5-1
Broadcasters: Robbie Bullough, Kristen Kozlowski, and Jake Edmonds

at Pepperdine
Series History: BYU leads series 4-2 
Broadcasters: Nick Law (TV-32)/ Ty Brandenburg (BYU Radio)

Portland
Series History: BYU leads series 10-4 
Broadcasters: Robbie Bullough, Kristen Kozlowski, and Jen Benson

Gonzaga
Series History: Series even 5-5 
Broadcasters: Robbie Bullough, Kristen Kozlowski, and Skyler Hardman

at Loyola Marymount
Series History: BYU leads series 5-0 
Broadcaster: Patrick Duggan

at Portland
Series History: BYU leads series 11-4 
Broadcasters: Sarah Griffin and Cody Barton (Portland on Stretch)/ Ty Brandenburg (BYU Radio)

WCC Quarterfinal: vs. Loyola Marymount
Series History: BYU leads series 5-1 
Broadcasters: Dave McCann and Blaine Fowler (Play-by-play); Steve Cleveland and Jarom Jordan (Halftime); Steve Cleveland, Blaine Fowler, and Jarom Jordan (Bridge Show)

WCC Semifinal: vs. Gonzaga
Series History: Gonzaga leads series 6-5 
Broadcasters: Dave McCann, Steve Cleveland, and Jarom Jordan

WNIT 1st Round: Idaho State
Series History: BYU leads series 11-3 
Broadcasters: Robbie Bullough, Kristen Kozlowski, and Andy Boyce

WNIT 2nd Round: San Diego State
Series History: BYU leads series 28-13 
Broadcasters: Dave McCann, Kristen Kozlowski, and Robbie Bullough

WNIT 3rd Round: Saint Mary's 
Series History: Series even 2-2 
Broadcasters: Robbie Bullough, Kristen Kozlowski, and Andy Boyce

Rankings

See also
BYU Cougars women's basketball

References

BYU Cougars women's basketball seasons
BYU
BYU
BYU Cougars
BYU Cougars